Herzebrock-Clarholz is a town in the district of Gütersloh in the state of North Rhine-Westphalia, Germany. It is located approximately 10 km west of Gütersloh.

Adjacent towns
Bredeck
Harsewinkel
Gütersloh
Rheda-Wiedenbrück
Oelde
Beelen

Twinning 
Herzebrock-Clarholz is twinned with:
Steenwijkerland, Netherlands
Le Chambon-Feugerolles, France

People

 Kaspar von Zumbusch (1830–1915), sculptor
 Diana Amft (born 1975), actress

 Carl Miele (1869-1938), German entrepreneur

References